The 1934 Alabama gubernatorial election took place on November 2, 1934, in order to elect the governor of Alabama. Democratic incumbent Benjamin M. Miller was term-limited, and could not seek a second consecutive term.

Democratic primary
At the time this election took place, Alabama, as with most other southern states, was solidly Democratic, and the Republican Party had such diminished influence that the Democratic primary was the de facto contest for state offices; after winning the Democratic primary it was a given you would win the general election.

Candidates
 Frank M. Dixon, attorney
 Bibb Graves, former Governor
 Leon Clarence McCord, circuit court judge

Results

Runoff
As no candidate received a majority of votes, a runoff election was held.

Results

References

1934
gubernatorial
Alabama
November 1934 events